The Communauté de communes du Secteur de Dompaire (before 2009: Communauté de communes du Pays d'Entre Madon et Moselle) is a former administrative association of communes in the Vosges département of eastern France and in the region of Lorraine. It was created in December 2000. It was merged into the new Communauté de communes de Mirecourt Dompaire in January 2017. Its seat was in Dompaire.

Composition 
The Communauté de communes comprised the following communes:

Les Ableuvenettes
Ahéville
Bainville-aux-Saules
Bazegney
Begnécourt
Bettegney-Saint-Brice
Bocquegney
Bouxières-aux-Bois
Bouzemont
Charmois-l'Orgueilleux
Circourt
Damas-et-Bettegney
Derbamont
Dommartin-aux-Bois
Dompaire
Gelvécourt-et-Adompt
Gorhey
Gugney-aux-Aulx
Hagécourt
Harol
Hennecourt
Jorxey
Légéville-et-Bonfays
Madegney
Madonne-et-Lamerey
Maroncourt
Pierrefitte
Racécourt
Regney
Saint-Vallier
Vaubexy
Velotte-et-Tatignécourt
Ville-sur-Illon

References

Dompaire